The Black Hills Institute of Geological Research, Inc. (BHI) is a private corporation specializing in the excavation and preparation of fossils, as well as the sale of both original fossil material and museum-quality replicas. Founded in 1974 and based in Hill City, South Dakota, the company is most famous for excavating and selling replicas of some of the most complete specimens of Tyrannosaurus rex, including "Sue", "Stan" and "Trix".

In March 1992, BHI owners founded the Black Hills Museum of Natural History in Hill City, a non-profit paleontological museum which is controlled by an independent Board of Directors.

In May 1992, the remains of "Sue" were seized from the BHI by the Federal Bureau of Investigation and were auctioned off five years later to the Field Museum of Natural History in Chicago, Illinois for US$7.6 million – the highest price ever paid for a fossil at the time.

See also 
 Peter Larson

References

External links
Official website
The Seizure of Sue the T. rex by Bob Newland

Fossil trade in the United States
Companies based in South Dakota
Paleontology in South Dakota

1974 establishments in South Dakota
American companies established in 1974